The 2010–11 Toledo Rockets women's basketball team represents University of Toledo during the 2010–11 NCAA Division I women's basketball season. The Rockets, led by third year head coach Tricia Cullop, play their home games at Savage Arena, as members of the West Division of the Mid-American Conference. They finished second in the West Division with a record of 29-8 overall and 14-2 in MAC play. They advanced to the semifinals of the MAC women's tournament where they lost to Eastern Michigan. They received an at large bid to the Women's National Invitation Tournament where they won the Tournament defeating USC 76-68 in front of a sellout crowd of 7,301 fans at Savage Arena. It was their second consecutive WNIT Tournament Appearance in a row.

Roster

Schedule

|-
!colspan=9 style="background:#000080; color:#F9D819;"| Exhibition

|-
!colspan=9 style="background:#000080; color:#F9D819;"| Non-conference regular season

|-
!colspan=9 style=| MAC regular season

|-
!colspan=9 style="background:#000080; color:#F9D819;"| MAC Women's Tournament

|-
!colspan=9 style=| WNIT

Source: ,

References

Toledo Rockets women's basketball seasons